“Vienna Celtic Rugby Football Club”, or Vienna Celtic RFC for short, is Austria's oldest Austrian rugby club, located in the 23rd district of Vienna.
The club currently represents the current championship team in the top Austrian men's division (ARC Premiership, season 19/20), but it also has a long tradition of training young players (boys and girls).

General
The name "Vienna Celtic" refers on the one hand to the common roots of the "ancestors" of the club, who came from Scotland, Wales, Ireland and the former Noricum (Noricum was a Celtic kingdom in the area of today’s Austria) and on the other hand to the very appropriate meaning of the name, "Celts": Keltoi = the brave (pronounced "Keltic").

The club is located on the ground of ASKÖ in Vienna's 23rd district, Steinergasse 12, and has its own clubhouse, a natural turf pitch and an artificial turf pitch suitable for contact sports.

Vienna Celtic RFC consists of two men's teams (“First 15” and “Wanderers”), one women's team (“Blue Ladies”), the Touch Rugby Team (“Touch Brigade”), a veterans team ("Celtic Old Boys") and a total of 8 teams for children and youngsters from 5 to 18 years, both boys and girls.
Our children in the Vienna Celtic Mini- and Junior Section are not only encouraged and challenged in terms of sport, but fundamental values of the club such as helpfulness, team spirit, respect, discipline and tolerance are lived and passed on as well.

The club offers everyone who is interested the opportunity to take part in the so-called "Social Touch" game, a Rugby game without physical contact, once a week.

Maintaining friendships with clubs in Austria and abroad is, in addition to our sporting development, extremely important for all Celts and is lived in accordance with the old Rugby tradition. Away games at home and abroad are therefore a top priority for the club. Until today Vienna Celtic is the most international Rugby club in Austria, with active members from more than 20 countries. Therefore, the social aspect is a special good for the members of the club. The so-called "third half" or "socializing", i.e. the social get-together of players from our own and the opposing teams, coaches, officials, former players and other club members and friends of the club is very important at the Vienna Celtic Rugby Football Club. These friendships that emerged are global due to the international nature of the club. Rugby tours to other countries have therefore been an integral part of every season up to now.

The following tours are mentioned as examples:
 1984, 2015 Wales 
 1986, 1993, 2013 Scotland
 1990, 2008, 2018 Ireland
 1991 Berlin
 1992, 1994 ,1996 Rotterdam
 1995 South Africa
 1997 Zimbabwe
 2000 St. Gallen
 2007 France
 2015 England
 and many, many more ….

In addition, there are long-lived traditions such as:
"Capitals Cup": an annual tournament between the international teams (expats teams) from: Budapest, Prague, Warsaw, Moscow, Vienna
"Caledonian Cup": every game against RC Munich is about the Caledonian Cup, which the winner can keep until the next match.

History
The Vienna Celtic RFC is the oldest Rugby club in Austria, it was founded on January 19, 1978 by a group of Rugby players from Great Britain and Austria.

The very first match played and won the "Celts" in 1978 against a combined team of players from the British and Australian embassies, the International Atomic Energy Agency IAEA, the American International School and U.N. staff.

Despite the prevailing political situation in the late 1970s, the club managed to find opponents from neighbouring countries and played successfully against Czechoslovak and Hungarian teams, e.g. Gottwaldov or Kecskemet.

Although the club was forced for many years due to the unsatisfactory infrastructural support from the city of Vienna to train without its own sports field and to play games in various rented football clubs, the club managed to grow steadily and to establish itself as a driving force in the slowly growing Austrian Rugby landscape. Already the first Austrian Rugby championship, held in 1992/93, was won by Vienna Celtic.

After long years of wandering around the club finally managed in 2015 to find a new home in the Atzgersdorf Federal Sports Center. The spacious sports complex with its own clubhouse offers the perfect environment for Rugby. Due to the relatively easy accessibility of the site by public transport, it was also possible to deepen and accelerate the youth work that is so important for an amateur sports club. The club now has eight youth teams from U6 to U18 (Under the age of 6 to Under the age of 18), both boys and girls.

A major concern of the association is the promotion of girls' Rugby, because although Rugby is a sport for every man and every woman, it is unfortunately still too often understood as a pure boys and men sport.

On October 4th, 2020, the “Blue Ladies” wrote club history - after more than 10 years without female representation Vienna Celtic RFC’s own women's team played at last at a tournament again - and won their first game.

Future
The future concept of the Vienna Celtic RFC includes the following 4 key points:

 The further expansion of the mini- and junior department, with the clear goal of becoming the best Rugby training club in Austria.
 The further development of the women's team in order to be able to play for titles with the Celtic Blue Ladies.
 The "First XV" (1st team) should always play for the Austrian championship title and also act internationally as an ambassador for Austrian Rugby.
 The further expansion of our new home (especially its infrastructure) together with the Austrian Rugby association in Atzgersdorf.

Current Staff
Chairman: Antonio de Vall 
Vice Chairman: Friedrich Barwinek 
Secretary: Rupert Supp 
Treasurer: Johannes Winkler 
Men's Team Manager: Johannes Fiebrich  
Women's Team Manager: Markus Cytra 
Youth Manager: Dominik Wieland 
Marketing & PR: Martin Klein-Lohrmann 
Gastronomy & Events: Martin Puchinger 
Coach: Steven Doyle 

Financial Controllers: Michaela Wieland , Andrea Karpeles

External links

Austrian rugby union teams
Rugby clubs established in 1978
Sport in Vienna